Choriceras is a genus of plants in the family Picrodendraceae first described as a genus in 1874.

Choriceras is native to New Guinea and to northern Australia.

Species
 Choriceras majus Airy Shaw - Queensland 
 Choriceras tricorne (Benth.) Airy Shaw - New Guinea, Northern Territory, Queensland

References

Taxonomy of the Picrodendraceae

Picrodendraceae
Malpighiales genera
Taxa named by Henri Ernest Baillon